The economic impact of undocumented immigrants in the United States is challenging to measure, and politically contentious. Research shows that undocumented immigrants increase the size of the U.S. economy/contribute to economic growth, enhance the welfare of natives, contribute more in tax revenue than they collect, reduce American firms' incentives to offshore jobs and import foreign-produced goods, and benefit consumers by reducing the prices of goods and services. Economists estimate that legalization of the undocumented immigrant population would increase the immigrants' earnings and consumption considerably, and increase U.S. gross domestic product.

Undocumented immigrant population

According to the Pew Research Center, there were 11.3 million illegal immigrants living in the United States in 2016, statistically unchanged from the previous year. The number peaked at 12.2 million in 2007, following a steady increase that began in 1990. An estimated 5.6 million unauthorized immigrants were from Mexico in 2015 and 2016, down from 6.4 million in 2009. Non-Mexicans numbered 5.7 million, indicating Mexicans are no longer the clear majority of unauthorized immigrants. The U.S. civilian workforce includes 8 million unauthorized immigrants, accounting for 5% of those working or looking for work in 2014. This number has been relatively stable since 2007, ranging between 8.0 and 8.3 million. Unauthorized immigrants represent 26% of farming and 15% of construction labor. They are primarily concentrated in six states: California, New Mexico, Texas, Florida, New York, New Jersey, and Illinois. About two-thirds have been in the U.S. for more than a decade.

The reduction has been driven mainly by a decrease in the number of new immigrants from Mexico, the single largest source. Net immigration from Mexico to the U.S. has stopped and possibly reversed since 2010. At its peak in 2000, about 770,000 immigrants arrived annually from Mexico; the majority arrived illegally. By 2010, the inflow had dropped to about 140,000—a majority of whom arrived as legal immigrants.

At its peak in August 2007, the number of undocumented immigrants in the U.S. was 12.5 million. This decreased by 1.3 million to 11.2 million by July 2008 (11%) due to either increased law enforcement or fewer job opportunities. Based on the Department of Homeland Security estimates in 2009, unauthorized immigrant population living in the United States decreased to 10.8 million in January 2009. On the whole, between 2000 and 2009, the unauthorized immigrant population grew by 27 percent.

Immigrants to the U.S. are concentrated at both the high and low-income ends of the U.S. labor market, determined largely by their educational attainment. In 2004, at the low end, half of workers age 25 and older who lacked a diploma were from Mexico and Central America. These workers were employed in jobs that required little formal education, such as construction labor and dishwashing, and on average they earned much less than did the average native worker.

Economic impact of illegal immigrants

Consumer demand
 An employer may benefit from the undocumented status of a migrant who is desperate for work and therefore prepared to accept poor pay that is below local norms. If paid under the table rather than using an ITIN, the employer will have an advantage of various non-wage benefits like saving the bonus and overtime payment including the advantage of paying the undocumented worker at the minimum rate.

Nearly every dollar earned by undocumented immigrants is spent immediately, and the average wage for US citizens is $10.25/hour with an average of 34 hours per week. This means that approximately 8 million US jobs are dependent upon economic activity produced by undocumented immigrant activities within the US. The U.S. government continues to stop immigration from Mexico even though it has done harm on wages in a number of industries. Immigrants have helped the U.S. tremendously and have created jobs for Americans and immigrants. Studies have shown that they contributed 2 trillion to the U.S. GDP in 2016 and have contributed 458.7 billion to federal taxes.

Budgetary impact

A 2007 review of the academic literature by the nonpartisan Congressional Budget Office (CBO) found that "over the past two decades, most efforts to estimate the fiscal impact of immigration in the United States have concluded that, in aggregate and over the long term, tax revenues of all types generated by immigrants—both legal and unauthorized—exceed the cost of the services they use." While the overall fiscal impact on the US is beneficial, unauthorized immigrants have an adverse impact on the budgets of state and local governments. While cautioning that the reports are not a suitable basis for developing an aggregate national effect across all states, they concluded that:
 "State and local governments incur costs for providing services to unauthorized immigrants and have limited options for avoiding or minimizing those costs";
 "The amount that state and local governments spend on services for unauthorized immigrants represents a small percentage of the total amount spent by those governments to provide such services to residents in their jurisdictions";
 "The tax revenues that unauthorized immigrants generate for state and local governments do not offset the total cost of services provided to those immigrants"; and
 "Federal aid programs offer resources to state and local governments that provide services to unauthorized immigrants, but those funds do not fully cover the costs incurred by those governments."
IRS estimates that about 6 million unauthorized immigrants file individual income tax returns each year. Research reviewed by the nonpartisan Congressional Budget Office indicates that between 50 percent and 75 percent of unauthorized immigrants pay federal, state, and local taxes. Illegal immigrants are estimated to pay in about $7 billion per year into Social Security. In addition, they spend billions of dollars per year, which supports the US economy and helps to create new jobs. The Texas State Comptroller reported in 2006 that the 1.4 million unauthorized immigrants in Texas added almost $18 billion to the gross state product, and contributed $1.58 billion in state revenue, while costing the state about $1.16 billion in services used.

The Social Security and Medicare contributions of illegal immigrants directly support older Americans, as illegal immigrants are not eligible to receive these services, although their children born in the United States are eligible for such benefits. Illegal immigrants pay social security payroll taxes but are not eligible for benefits. During 2006, Standard & Poor's analysts wrote: "Each year, for example, the U.S. Social Security Administration maintains roughly $6 billion to $7 billion of Social Security contributions in an "earnings suspense file"—an account for W-2 tax forms that cannot be matched to the correct Social Security number. The vast majority of these numbers are attributable to undocumented workers who will never claim their benefits. For 2010, the Social Security Administration estimated that unauthorized immigrants and their employers paid $13 billion in required social security payroll taxes.

The Social Security Administration has stated that it believes unauthorized work by non-citizens is a major cause of wage items being posted as erroneous wage reports instead of on an individual's earnings record. When Social Security numbers are already in use; names do not match the numbers or the numbers are fake, or the person of record is too old, young, dead etc., the earnings reported to the Social Security Agency are put in an Earnings Suspense file. The Social Security spends about $100 million a year and corrects all but about 2% of these. From tax years 1937 through 2003 the ESF had accumulated about 255 million mismatched wage reports, representing $520 billion in wages and about $75 billion in employment taxes paid into the over $1.5 trillion in the Social Security Trust funds. As of October 2005, approximately 8.8 million wage reports, representing $57.8 billion in wages remained unresolved in the suspense file for tax year 2003.

Estimates indicate that about 4% of the school-age population is made up of children who are illegal immigrants.  Many require remedial assistance in language skills, which increases costs to the public schools. During April 2006, Standard & Poor's analysts wrote: "Local school districts are estimated to educate 1.8 million undocumented children. At an average annual cost of $7,500 (averages vary by jurisdiction) per student, the cost of providing education to these children is about $11.2 billion." Other estimates of the costs to educate unauthorized children and US-born children of unauthorized immigrants reached $30 billion in 2009.

Congressional Budget Office (2015) reports that “policies designed to improve verification of a person’s legal status at the workplace would target the estimated 8 million unauthorized residents who work.” Under the Administration’s deferred action programs, certain percentage of people have already received or will be receiving an authorization to work. There is the requirement saying that every new employee need to have the proof of the work authorization and their worker identity. However, there are still some workers left without the authorization.

Price levels

NPR reported in March 2006 that when the wages of lower-skilled workers go down, the rest of America benefits by paying lower prices for things like restaurant meals, agricultural produce and construction. The economic impact of unauthorized immigration is far smaller than other trends in the economy, such as the increasing use of automation in manufacturing or the growth in global trade. But economists generally believe that when averaged over the whole economy, the effect is a small net positive. Harvard's George Borjas says the average American's wealth is increased by less than 1 percent because of unauthorized immigration.

According to the report presented by Eleanor Chelimsky and the team, hiring an illegal immigrant can have both negative as well as positive effects. For instance, if a restaurant hires a cheap labor of unauthorized workers, it will reduce the employer’s cost eventually leading them to reduce the price for the foods served in the restaurant. The illegal workers are hired by the employers in the companies, competing in the same market with similar businesses that are hiring the legal workers. Due to the competition on the products sold in that free market, increase in illegal immigration may decrease the wage rate of the legal workers. In case of the inflow of unauthorized workers reducing the costs of operation leading to the reduction of prices on a product/services provided, the demand for the services of legal workers with low-skill jobs (such as fast food restaurants, agricultural sectors and construction) will decrease. However, on a positive note, the reduced price on the menu will attract more customers increasing their volume of sales. As a result, this will “increase the demand for the noncompeting category of workers, such as chefs or waiters”.

Impact on wages

Economists have different conclusions regarding the impact on wages from immigration, both legal and illegal. It is challenging to separate the impact of illegal immigration (generally workers with lower educational attainment) from immigration overall. Studies generally conclude there is a small adverse impact on the wages of lower-skilled workers from immigration and some benefit for higher-skilled workers:
Research by economist David Card University of California-Berkeley) indicated the effect of immigration on native born workers without high school degrees is limited, perhaps reducing the wages of high school dropouts by 5.1% over 20 years.
Harvard economist George Borjas wrote in 2007 that: "Economic theory implies that immigration should lower the wage of competing workers and increase the wage of complementary workers. For example, an influx of foreign-born laborers reduces the economic opportunities for laborers — all laborers now face stiffer competition in the labor market. At the same time, high-skill natives may gain substantially. They pay less for the services that laborers provide, such as painting the house and mowing the lawn, and natives who hire these laborers can now specialize in producing the goods and services that better suit their skills." Borjas' other research also indicated that "high-school dropouts experience a substantial wage loss from immigration of 6.3% in the short run and 3.1% over the long haul as labor markets adjust to the increased number of workers."
A 2015 National Academy of Sciences report concluded that native-born workers who are substitutes for immigrants (e.g., lower-skilled workers in the case of illegal immigrants) "will experience negative wage effects." The report continues: "In summary, the immigration surplus [overall net benefit from immigration] stems from the increase in the return to capital that results from the increased supply of labor and the subsequent fall in wages. Natives who own more capital will receive more income from the immigration surplus than natives who own less capital, who can consequently be adversely affected."
The Brookings Institution reported in 2012 that: "[T]he most recent economic evidence suggests that, on average, immigrant workers increase the opportunities and incomes of Americans.  Based on a survey of the academic literature, economists do not tend to find that immigrants cause any sizeable decrease in wages and employment of U.S.-born citizens, and instead may raise wages and lower prices in the aggregate." However, certain groups may be adversely affected. Brookings pointed to two studies at the opposite ends of the impact spectrum, one (Borjas-Katz 2007) indicating a 4.5% reduction in the wages of native workers that were high-school dropouts and a roughly 1.6% reduction for native college graduates, with another (Ottaviano-Peri 2008) indicating a small positive for all education levels.

In 2008, Gordon H. Hanson at University of California–San Diego and National Bureau of Economic Research performed a study to see if illegal immigration affects native workers employment. From the study was concluded that unauthorized immigrants provide a source of manpower in agriculture, construction, food processing, building cleaning and maintenance, and other low-end jobs. Cities with a high percentage of illegal immigration were examined in this study and data showed that illegal immigrants overall impact on the US economy is small. On the other hand, US employers gain from lower labor costs and the ability to use their land, capital, and technology more productively.

Health care

Reuters reported that illegal immigrants, as well as legal immigrants in the country less than five years, generally are not eligible for Medicaid. However, they can get Medicaid coverage for health emergencies if they are in a category of people otherwise eligible, such as children, pregnant women, families with dependent children, elderly or disabled individuals, and meet other requirements. The cost of this emergency care was less than 1% of Medicaid costs in North Carolina from 2001–2004 and the majority was for childbirth and related complications. USA Today reported that "Illegal immigrants can get emergency care through Medicaid, the federal-state program for the poor and people with disabilities. But they can't get non-emergency care unless they pay. They are ineligible for most other public benefits."

Because of the U.S. Emergency Medical Treatment and Active Labor Act of 1986, most hospitals may not refuse anyone treatment for an emergency medical condition because of citizenship, legal status, or ability to pay. An example of the cost conflict between federal government, state and local government, and private institutions, the Immigration and Naturalization Service brings injured and ill unauthorized immigrants to hospital emergency rooms but does not pay for their medical care.  Almost $190 million, or about 25 percent, of the uncompensated costs Southwest border county hospitals incurred resulted from emergency medical treatment provided to illegal immigrants.

At least two research studies have been done which attempt to discover the cost of health care for illegal immigrants by asking the illegal themselves.
 A phone survey in which Alexander Ortega and colleagues at the University of California asked illegal immigrants how often they receive medical care reported that illegal immigrants are no more likely to visit the emergency room than native born Americans.
 A RAND study concluded that the total federal cost of providing medical expenses for the 78% illegal immigrants without health insurance coverage was $1.1 billion, with immigrants paying $321 million of health care costs out-of-pocket. The study found that illegal immigrants tend to visit physicians less frequently than U.S. citizens because they are younger and because people with chronic health problems are less likely to migrate.

Moreover, studies have also shown that not providing illegal immigrants with a decent healthcare might actually cost the country in the long-run rather than save expenses. In 2000, researchers compared the perinatal outcomes and costs of illegal women with and without prenatal care and inferred the impact of denial of prenatal benefits to illegal immigrants in California. Nearly 10% of illegal women had no prenatal care. These women were nearly 4 times as likely to be delivered of low birth weight infants and more than 7 times as likely to be delivered of premature infants as were illegal women who had prenatal care. For every dollar cut from prenatal care, an increase of $3.33 in the cost of postnatal care and $4.63 in incremental long-term cost were expected. Elimination of publicly funded prenatal care for illegal women could save the state $58 million in direct prenatal care costs but could cost taxpayers as much as $194 million more in postnatal care, resulting in a net cost of $136 million initially and $211 million in long-term costs. Although their parents are illegal immigrants, these children are actually U.S citizens.

Effect on income inequality
Economist David Card wrote in 2009 that immigration (legal and illegal) has a minor impact on income inequality and wages: "Together these results imply that the impacts of recent immigrant inflows on the relative wages of U.S. natives are small. The effects on overall wage inequality (including natives and immigrants) are larger, reflecting the concentration of immigrants in the tails of the skill distribution and higher residual inequality among immigrants than natives. Even so, immigration accounts for a small share (5%) of the increase in U.S. wage inequality between 1980 and 2000."

Overall benefits and costs
Members of the IGM Economic Experts Panel were asked in December 2013 whether they agreed or disagreed with the following statement: "The average US citizen would be better off if a larger number of low-skilled foreign workers were legally allowed to enter the US each year." Fifty-two percent either agreed or strongly agreed with the statement, with 28% uncertain and 9% disagreeing. Regarding a second statement, that low-skilled American workers would be "substantially worse off" if more low-skilled immigrants were allowed entry, 50% agreed or strongly agreed, with 30% uncertain and 9% disagreeing or strongly disagreeing. In other words, despite an overall benefit for the average American, some low-skilled workers already in the U.S. would probably be adversely impacted by a greater supply of low-skilled labor.

Non-citizen farm workers are frequently involved in pesticide applications. Nonetheless they are less likely to speak English, or even Spanish. That can be a problem because written materials are in English and sometimes in Spanish in this country. Pesticide education materials are needed for the indigenous languages of Mexico.

Cost-benefit analysis
Aviva Chomsky, a professor at Salem State College, states that "Early studies in California and in the Southwest and in the Southeast...have come to the same conclusions. Immigrants, legal and illegal, are more likely to pay taxes than they are to use public services. Illegal immigrants are not eligible for most public services and live in fear of revealing themselves to government authorities. Households headed by illegal immigrants use less than half the amount of federal services that households headed by documented immigrants or citizens make use of."

National Public Radio (NPR) wrote in 2006: "Supporters of a crackdown argue that the U.S. economy would benefit if illegal immigrants were to leave, because U.S. employers would be forced to raise wages to attract American workers.  Critics of this approach say the loss of illegal immigrants would stall the U.S. economy, saying illegal workers do many jobs few native-born Americans will do."

Professor of Law Francine Lipman writes that the belief that illegal migrants are exploiting the US economy and that they cost more in services than they contribute to the economy is "undeniably false". Lipman asserts that "illegal immigrants actually contribute more to public coffers in taxes than they cost in social services" and "contribute to the U.S. economy through their investments and consumption of goods and services; filling of millions of essential worker positions resulting in subsidiary job creation, increased productivity and lower costs of goods and services; and unrequited contributions to Social Security, Medicare and unemployment insurance programs."

Relative contribution by income tax bracket
PEW studies on unauthorized immigrants estimates that the average household of 3.1 persons earns about $36,000 per year. This average wage is consistent with the PEW estimate that 49% of illegal immigrants have not graduated from high school.

The Congressional Budget Office (CBO) estimates that people in this salary bracket (the second quintile) pay about 6.8% of their income in Federal taxes.

The Heritage Foundation estimates that the average household in the bottom quintile received $29,015 in benefits and paid $4,251 in Federal, state and local taxes. In the second quintile the average household received $24,709 in benefits and paid $9,524 in Federal, state and local taxes. In the top quintile, the average household received $21,515 in benefits and services and paid $69,704 in Federal, state and local taxes. However, it is unclear how much benefit the average unauthorized immigrant household is eligible for.

Heritage Foundation Study
In 2013, Robert Rector and Jason Richwine of The Heritage Foundation released a study concluding that as of 2010, the "average unlawful immigrant household" had a net deficit (benefits received minus taxes paid) of $14,387 per household. Critics of the Rector-Richwine report "questioned several assumptions made by the report’s authors—everything from the amount that legalization could boost earnings for immigrants to the amount of welfare they may use." The Heritage report purported to project costs over a 50-year period and assumed no changes to Social Security or Medicare, which prompted criticism that the study was overly speculative. The report also counted "the cost of benefits paid to the children of those living in the U.S. illegally, even though many of those children by law are citizens." The methodology and conclusions of the 2013 Heritage Foundation study were sharply criticized as flawed by, among others, Alex Nowrasteh of the Cato Institute, Doug Holtz-Eakin of the American Action Forum, and Tim Kane at the Hudson Institute. Nowrasteh wrote that the Heritage report's refusal to account for GDP growth and increased economic productivity from immigration led to "a massive underestimation of the economic benefits of immigration and diminishing estimated tax revenue." Republican Senator Marco Rubio of Florida also criticized the report.

Income Taxes and Eligibility for Tax Credits
Income taxes and eligibility for tax credits are determined based on people’s status of lawful permanent residency. Or else, it is based on the fact, how long anyone has been staying in the United States, despite them being here legally or not. The Congressional Budget Office does not have the estimation of the amount of federal taxes paid by the undocumented people in the country.

Eligibility for Other Benefits

Those people who have the permanent legal status are eligible for most of the government benefits such as Social Security, Medicare, Refundable tax Credits, Unemployment Insurance, and Pell Grants and Student Loans. The undocumented people staying in US, however, are not eligible for these federal programs except for the Child Nutrition Programs. Although few exceptions may apply regarding the Medicare, Social Security, Child Health Insurance Program and Refundable Tax Credits. Karoly and Perez-Arce (2016) did the case study on college tuition and came to the finding of a policy-relevant results. The policy to provide in-state tuition benefits to the undocumented immigrants resulted with direct and secondary economic and fiscal effects. This policy provided incentives to the people born outside of the United States to come to the country to take the advantage of the benefit. This direct cost, in a long run creates more high-skilled workers, who would raise wages, in no time, and tax revenues, improving the overall fiscal picture.

See also
 E-Verify
 Proposition 187
 Gallegly amendment
 DREAM Act
 Plyler v. Doe
 Mexica Movement
 Economic results of migration
Immigration and crime

References

Economy of the United States
Demographic economics
Illegal immigration to the United States
Informal economy
Economic impact of immigration